Jim Crow Creek may refer to:

Jim Crow Creek (California)
Jim Crow Creek (Washington)